Yellowdog Creative Project Management (also known as 'Yellowdog CPM' or just 'Yellowdog') is an independent record label, project management platform, tour management and promotions representing a variety of artists and bands. The business trades in the United Kingdom, France, Netherlands, Italy, Sweden, Ireland & United States.

Notable artists
 Blaze Bayley
 Thomas Zwijsen
 Monkey Anna
 Clownage
 Neurasthenia
 Kathryn Prescott
 John Parker

Discography
 Russian Holiday, EP, 2013, Blaze Bayley
 Nylon Maiden, Album, 2013, Thomas Zwijsen
 Icarus, EP, 2013, John Parker & Sam O'Doherty

Master Guitar Tour 2014
In 2014 Yellowdog organised the Master Guitar Tour featuring Thomas Zwijsen, Benjamin Woods and Glenn Roth. The show is a fusion of the three guitarists styles: classical guitar, flamenco and fingerstyle.

The 2014 tour listing is:

 25/04 Créateur Culinair, Sint-Gillis-Waas, B
 26/04 Michael Collins Club, Brussels, B
 27/04 Club Razzmatazz, Oost-Souburg, NL
 30/04 Templet, Copenhagen, DK
 03/05 Black Hand Inn, Gadenstedt, D
 05/05 Attic Rock Club, Litvinov, CZ
 06/05 Melodka, Brno, CZ
 08/05 Club Reigen Live, Vienna, AT
 13/05 Molly Malone's Club, Timișoara, R 
 15/05 Club Adams, Sofia, BG
 17/05 Il Peocio, Turin, IT
 18/05 Auditorium Communale, Modella, IT 
 23/05 Cricketers, Dover, UK 
 24/05 O2 Academy2, London, UK 
 25/05 The Musician, Leicester, UK 
 26/05 The Tudor, Wigan, UK 
 28/05 Brudenell Social Club, Leeds, UK 
 30/05 Bronzen Beelden Festival, Hulst, NL

See also
 List of record labels

References

External links
 Yellowdog Official site

British independent record labels